Anna-Carin Jonasson (born 19 November 1971) is a retired Swedish professional golfer. In 1994 she won the Spanish Ladies Amateur and a bronze medal at the Espirito Santo Trophy. She played on the Ladies European Tour and the Ladies Asian Golf Tour between 1995 and 1998.

Amateur career
Jonasson had a successful amateur career and won the Finnish Ladies Open Amateur Championship in 1988 and was a semi-finalist at the 1992 SM Match Play. In 1994, she won the German Ladies Open Amateur Championship and the Spanish International Ladies Amateur Championship.

She represented the Continent of Europe at the 1993 Vagliano Trophy and finished 4th representing Sweden at the 1993 European Ladies' Team Championship. In 1994, she captained the winning Swedish team at the European Lady Junior's Team Championship and represented Sweden at the Espirito Santo Trophy at Golf National in Paris, France, where she finished as bronze medalist together with Sofie Eriksson and Maria Hjorth.

Jonasson played on the Swedish Golf Tour as an amateur and won the Rörstrand Ladies Open in 1994.

Professional career
Jonasson turned professional and joined the Ladies European Tour in 1995. In her rookie season, she played 11 tournaments and finished 84th on the Order of Merit. In 1996, she played 15 tournaments and ended the season ranked 53rd, after finishing T5 at the La Manga Spanish Open and T6 at Ladies English Open. In 1997, she recorded a T4 at the Ladies Swiss Open and a solo fifth place at the American Express Tour Player's Classic in England, and finished the season ranked a career high of 36th.

Jonasson also played on the Ladies Asian Golf Tour the 1996, 1997 and 1998 seasons, where she recorded a T3 at the 1996 Indonesian Ladies Open and a T3 again at the 1997 Philippine Toyota Ladies Open, two strokes behind winner Pernilla Sterner and one behind runner-up Åsa Gottmo.

After retiring from tour, Jonasson became a PGA Teaching Professional based in Malmö and changed to her married last name of Carlsson.

Amateur wins
1988 Finnish Ladies Open Amateur Championship
1994 Spanish International Ladies Amateur Championship, German Ladies Open Amateur Championship
Source:

Professional wins (2)

Swedish Golf Tour wins (2)

Team appearances
Amateur
European Ladies' Team Championship (representing Sweden): 1993
Vagliano Trophy (representing the Continent of Europe): 1993 
Espirito Santo Trophy (representing Sweden): 1994

Sources:

References

External links

Swedish female golfers
Ladies European Tour golfers
Sportspeople from Skåne County
People from Landskrona Municipality
1971 births
Living people